"Ealdwood" is a fantasy novella by American writer C. J. Cherryh. One of Cherryh's Ealdwood Stories,  it was first published in 1981 by Donald M. Grant in a limited edition of 1,050 copies. The edition was illustrated by the author's brother, David A. Cherry. The novella draws on Celtic mythology and is about Ealdwood, a forest at the edge of Faery, and Arafel, a Daoine Sidhe.

"Ealdwood" and the author's 1979 short story "The Dreamstone" (published in Amazons!, edited by Jessica Amanda Salmonson) were combined and revised by Cherryh and published as a novel, The Dreamstone in 1983. Cherryh published a sequel to The Dreamstone later in 1983, The Tree of Swords and Jewels.

Award nominations
 1982 World Fantasy Award, Novella
 1982 Locus Award, Novella

References

Sources

1981 American novels
1981 fantasy novels
Novels about fairies and sprites
Novels about magic
Fantasy novels by C. J. Cherryh
Donald M. Grant, Publisher books